Felix Drewry Williamson (July 26, 1921 – January 24, 1947) was a highly decorated United States Army Air Forces major. He was a flying ace credited with 13 aerial victories, including five in a single day, for which he was awarded the Distinguished Service Cross during World War II.

Early life and career 
Felix D. Williamson was born on July 26, 1921 in Crisp County, Georgia. Williamson enlisted into the United States Army in September 1941. He subsequently went to Fort Jackson, South Carolina, where he was transferred to the United States Army Air Forces.

World War II flying ace 
Williamson was soon assigned to the 62nd Fighter Squadron, 56th Fighter Group, Eight Air Force. Williamson's squadron was assigned to Royal Air Force Station Halesworth in Suffolk, England. The 62nd Fighter Squadron flew P-47 Thunderbolts in Europe, and Williamson named his aircraft "Georgia Peach." On November 29, 1943, First Lieutenant Williamson downed his first German plane, sharing a victory with a fellow fighter pilot.

On April 19, 1944, Captain Williamson's squadron moved to Royal Air Force Station Boxted in Essex, England. On December 23, 1944, Williamson downed two German planes, becoming an ace and bringing his total number of victories to six.

Captain Williamson claimed his next series of victories on January 14, 1945. On that date, he shot down five enemy planes during a single mission. For his actions, Williamson was awarded the Distinguished Service Cross.

On February 3, 1945, Williamson downed two more German planes, claiming his final victories and finished the war with 13 total kills. In addition to his Distinguished Service Cross, Williamson was awarded four Distinguished Flying Crosses, three Air Medals and the Purple Heart.

Post-war and death 
After the war, Williamson was promoted to major and was assigned to the 1st Fighter Group at March Field in Riverside County, California. At March Field, Williamson flew the United States' first operational fighter jet, the P-80 Shooting Star.

On January 24, 1947, Major Felix D. Williamson was killed in a mid-air collision with another P-80 pilot near March Field. He was buried at Penia Baptist Church Cemetery in Cordele, Georgia.

References 

1921 births
1947 deaths
American World War II flying aces
Aviators from Georgia (U.S. state)
Aviators killed in aviation accidents or incidents in the United States
Recipients of the Distinguished Service Cross (United States)
Recipients of the Distinguished Flying Cross (United States)
Recipients of the Air Medal
United States Army Air Forces pilots of World War II